Fort Whyte is a provincial electoral division in the Canadian province of Manitoba. It was created in 1999, after the provincial electoral boundaries commission determined that southwestern Winnipeg had experienced enough population growth to deserve an extra seat. Fort Whyte was created from territory formerly belonging to Tuxedo, Fort Garry and St. Norbert.

Following Manitoba's 2018 electoral redistribution, Fort Whyte is bordered to the east by Fort Garry, to the south by Waverley, to the west by Roblin, and to the north by River Heights and Tuxedo.

The constituency's population in 2018 was 21,780. The average family income in 2018 was $117,535. The unemployment rate is 4.9%, and 19.2% of the population is above 65 years of age. Almost 42% of the population have university degrees. Health and social services account for 13.5% of Fort Whyte's industry, with a further 10.4% in Retail Trade.

Fort Whyte is an ethnically diverse constituency, with an immigrant population of 25.6%. 6.7% of the riding's residents are East Indian, 5.6% are Chinese.

The constituency has been held by the Progressive Conservative Party of Manitoba (PCs) for its entire existence, and has always been comfortably safe for that party. The riding's first Member of the Legislative Assembly (MLA), John Loewen, won it handily in 1999 even as the Tories were soundly defeated by the New Democratic Party of Manitoba in that year's provincial election, after having been in government for over eleven years. On September 23, 2005, Loewen announced that he was leaving provincial politics to seek the Liberal Party of Canada's nomination for Charleswood—St. James—Assiniboia in the federal election anticipated. He formally resigned from the legislature on September 26.

On December 13, 2005, a by-election was held to fill Loewen's seat. The winner was another Tory, Hugh McFadyen. A few months later, McFadyen became leader of the provincial PCs. McFadyen was easily re-elected in the 2007 provincial election, but was one of only four PC MLAs returned from Winnipeg. After the PCs were again defeated in 2011, McFadyen announced he would retire from politics as soon as a successor was chosen. Former provincial MLA and federal MP Brian Pallister was elected his successor, and easily won Fort Whyte in the ensuing by-election.

Pallister served as Premier of Manitoba while MLA for Fort Whyte from 2016, leading the party to a second electoral mandate in 2019, until 2021, when he resigned first as premier and later as an MLA. A by-election to replace his vacancy was held on March 22, 2022, in which another Progressive Conservative, Obby Khan, won the seat.

List of provincial representatives

Electoral history

 
|Progressive Conservative
|Brian Pallister
|align="right"|3,626
|align="right"|55.22
|align="right"|-7.22
|align="right"|$32,215.06

 
|Independent
|Darrell Ackman
|align="right"|19
|align="right"|0.29
|align="right"|
|align="right"|211.37

Previous boundaries

References

Manitoba provincial electoral districts
Politics of Winnipeg